Tororo Solar Power Station, also Tororo Solar North Power Station, is a  solar power plant in Uganda, the third-largest economy in the East African Community.

Location
The geographical coordinates of Tororo Solar Power Station are 0°37'50.0"N, 34°06'40.0"E (Latitude:0.630556; Longitude:34.111111).

Overview
The power station has a capacity of 10 megawatts, sold directly to the Uganda Electricity Transmission Company Limited for integration in the national electricity grid. The electricity is evacuated via a substation near the power station. The energy generated will power approximately 40,000 homes, located near the power station, thus minimizing transmission losses.

Developers
The power station was developed by a special purpose vehicle company, "Tororo Solar North Limited', specifically set up to develop, build and operate this solar power station. Tororo Solar is majority owned by  Building Energy SpA, an International developer of renewable power sources, with headquarters in Milan, Italy. Other owners in the consortium include the Ugandan "Simba Group". The Simba Group also owns Electromaxx Limited, the owner-operator of the 70 megawatt Tororo Thermal Power Station, commissioned in 2010. The power generated at this power station is expected to serve an estimated 170,600 people.

Construction timeline, costs and funding
The cost of construction was budgeted at US$19.6 million, of which the owners contributed US$4.9 million. The remaining US$14.7 million was borrowed from Netherlands Development Finance Company (FMO). Fifty percent of the FMO loan was syndicated from the Emerging Africa Infrastructure Fund (EAIF), which is substantially funded by the governments of the United Kingdom, The Netherlands, Sweden and Switzerland and by the German development finance institution, KFW and its Dutch equivalent, FMO. The project is a beneficiary of the GETFit Uganda program led by KfW, receiving  grant support from (amongst other contributors) the EU-Africa Infrastructure Trust Fund (EU-AITF). Construction began on 14 December 2016, and commissioning was performed on 16 October 2017.

See also

List of power stations in Uganda
Soroti Solar Power Station

References

External links
 Uganda Secures Funding for Key Solar PV Projects
 Uganda To Increase Power Generation
 20MW of solar energy to be added to National Grid
 Building Energy SpA: Company Profile: List of Projects	

Solar power stations in Uganda
Tororo District
Eastern Region, Uganda
2017 establishments in Uganda
Energy infrastructure completed in 2017